Lugduname (from lat. Lugdunum for Lyon) is one of the most potent sweetening agents known. Lugduname has been estimated to be between 220,000 and 300,000 times as sweet as sucrose (table sugar), with estimates varying between studies. It was developed at the University of Lyon, France in 1996. Lugduname is part of a family of potent sweeteners which contain acetic acid functional groups attached to guanidine.

See also
 Carrelame
 Sucrononic acid

References

External links

Sugar substitutes
Guanidines
Benzonitriles
Benzodioxoles
Anilines
Amino acids